Seonbawi Station is a station on Seoul Subway Line 4 in Gwacheon, Gyeonggi-do. Most of its passengers use the station as a transfer point between various buses and Line 4. Besides a few bus stops, there really is not much else in the vicinity of this station.

Station layout

References

Seoul Metropolitan Subway stations
Railway stations opened in 1994
Metro stations in Gwacheon